The 2019 Western Athletic Conference softball tournament was held at GCU Softball Stadium on the campus of Grand Canyon University in Phoenix, Arizona, from May 8 through May 11, 2019. All six eligible softball teams competed as part of the tournament. Cal Baptist was ineligible to participate as they were in year one of the four year reclassification process.

Tournament

Schedule

References

Western Athletic Conference softball tournament
2019 Western Athletic Conference softball season
2019 in sports in Arizona